HMS Peregrine was a  which served with the Royal Navy during the First World War. The M class were an improvement on the preceding , capable of higher speed. Launched on 29 May 1916, the vessel served with the Grand Fleet, focusing on anti-submarine warfare. In 1917, the destroyer was involved in the search for  after the submarine had sunk the protected cruiser . After the Armistice that ended the war, the destroyer was placed in reserve and subsequently sold to be broken up on 9 May 1921.

Design and development
Peregrine was one of sixteen s ordered by the British Admiralty in May 1915 as part of the Fifth War Construction Programme. The M-class was an improved version of the earlier  destroyers, designed to reach a higher speed in order to counter rumoured German fast destroyers, although it transpired these vessels did not exist.

Displacement was  normal and  full load.

Armament consisted of three  Mk IV QF guns on the ship's centreline, with one on the forecastle, one aft on a raised platform and one between the middle and aft funnels. A single 2-pounder (40 mm) pom-pom anti-aircraft gun was carried, while torpedo armament consisted of two twin tubes for  torpedoes. The ship had a complement of 76 officers and ratings.

Construction and career
Peregrine was laid down by John Brown & Company of Clydebank, alongside sister ship  on 9 June 1915, with the yard number 448, launched on 29 May the following year and completed on 10 June. The ship was named after the Peregrine falcon, a title that dates from 1650. The vessel was deployed as part of the Grand Fleet, joining the newly formed Fourteenth Destroyer Flotilla.

Peregrine spent most of the First World War in anti-submarine escorting and patrols. For example, on 15 June 1917, the vessel, along with the rest of the flotilla, was involved in a large sweep of the area west of the Shetland Islands. The destroyer did not succeed in spotting or sinking any submarines. On 26 July, the destroyer was escorting the protected cruiser  from Immingham to Plymouth, to lay a deep minefield. Off the coast of Folkestone, the German U-boat , captained by Korvettenkapitän Otto Steinbrinck, sighted the vessels and launched two torpedoes. The torpedoes hit, sinking Ariadne, while Peregrine unsuccessfully searched for the submarine.

After the armistice, the Royal Navy returned to a peacetime level of mobilisation and Peregrine was declared superfluous to operational requirements. On 29 November 1919, the destroyer was reduced and placed in reserve. However, this did not last long and, on 5 November 1921, Peregrine was sold to be broken up to Cashmore or Newport, Wales.

Pennant numbers

References

Citations

Bibliography

 
 
 
 
 
 
 
 
 
 

1916 ships
Admiralty M-class destroyers
Ships built on the River Clyde
World War I destroyers of the United Kingdom